Brace (formerly known as Brace For War) was  an Australian mixed martial arts (MMA) promotion. Brace was founded in 2005 by Kya Pate. In an interview with MMA Kanvas Kya Pate detailed what it is like to be the promoter of Australian MMA.

Since 2009 Brace has staged 50 events in 9 cities over 4 Australian States. After following the standard MMA format, in 2014 Brace changed to an elimination tournament format based on the style of AFL, NRL, A-League soccer. 8 Fighters per division compete in knock out elimination rounds all aiming to reach an end of season Grand Final event.

Brace follows the Unified Rules of Mixed Martial Arts.

Broadcast partners
Brace is broadcast live on Network TEN exclusively in Australia and Fight Network based out of Canada

In November 2014, Brace signed a multi year multi event broadcast deal with Network TEN (a major Australian TV network), this is the first for any MMA event within Australia

UFC Fight Pass will begin streaming Brace MMA live events and the promotion’s fight library later in 2015.

Current champions

Past Events list

Notable alumni
Bec Rawlings (UFC)
Alex Chambers (UFC)
Ben Alloway (UFC)
Damien Brown (UFC)
Richard Walsh(UFC)

References

External links

List of Events on Sherdog

2009 establishments in Australia
Mixed martial arts organizations
Sports organisations of Australia
Sports organizations established in 2009
Mixed martial arts in Australia